Leonard Register from the University of Texas at Austin was named a Fellow of the Institute of Electrical and Electronics Engineers (IEEE) in 2016 for contributions to modeling of charge transport in nanoscale CMOS devices.

References 

Fellow Members of the IEEE
Living people
Year of birth missing (living people)
University of Texas at Austin faculty
Place of birth missing (living people)
American electrical engineers